The 2006 Colorado gubernatorial election was held on November 7, 2006. Incumbent Republican governor Bill Owens was unable to run due to term limits, and the election was won by Democratic nominee Bill Ritter.

Democratic primary

Candidates
Bill Ritter, former District Attorney of Denver

Campaign
In the leadup to the Democratic primary, Bill Ritter, the former District Attorney of Denver, emerged as the leading Democratic candidate. Though several other prominent state Democrats, including Denver Mayor John Hickenlooper and State House Speaker Andrew Romanoff, considered running for Governor, both ultimately declined to do so. State Representative Gary Lindstrom, the only other candidate besides Ritter in the race, ended his campaign on February 28, 2006. Ritter's personal opposition to abortion motivated pro-choice leaders in the state party to seek alternatives to him, but none ultimately materialized, and opposition to Ritter softened with his pledge to not alter the state's liberal abortion laws.

Results

Republican primary

Candidates
 Bob Beauprez, U.S. Congressman from Colorado's 7th congressional district

Campaign
With popular two-term Governor Bill Owens barred from seeking re-election, an open race developed for the Republican nomination to succeed him. The race looked like it would be between Congressman Bob Beauprez, who represented the swingy Denver suburbs in Congress, and former University of Denver President Marc Holtzman. The race between Beauprez and Holtzman was contentious. Beauprez accused Holtzman of ethics violations, including making false allegations that the campaign's email list was stolen, providing falsified poll results to the Denver Post, and using a separate state campaign committee as a "shadow gubernatorial campaign." Holtzman, meanwhile, accused Beauprez of being part of the "politics of power" that he argued had taken the party away from its conservative values, pointing to Beauprez's support of Referendum C in 2005, which allowed the state to hold onto excess tax revenues rather than refund surpluses.

In the end, the campaign between the two frontrunners fizzled. Beauprez won a landslide victory at the state Republican convention, denying Holtzman a spot on the ballot. Holtzman's efforts to collect signatures to win a spot on the ballot were ultimately in vain, with the Colorado Supreme Court ruling in June that he had failed to submit enough signatures. In response, Holtzman suspended his campaign and endorsed Beauprez, who won the Republican primary unopposed.

Results

Campaign

Predictions

Polling

Results

See also
U.S. gubernatorial elections, 2006
State of Colorado
Governors of Colorado
List of Colorado ballot measures

References

External links
Official campaign websites (Archived)
Bill Ritter
Bob Beauprez
Dawn Winkler
Decision 2006, Candidates section, Governor's Race

 
Governor
2006
Colorado